Oatley may refer to:

People 
 Bob Oatley (1928–2016), Australian businessman, winemaker, yachtsman and philanthropist
 Charles Oatley (1904–1996), electrical engineer
 George Oatley (1863–1950), architect
 Jacqui Oatley (born 1975), broadcaster
 James Oatley (c. 1769–1839), convict and landowner
 Keith Oatley (born 1939), novelist and psychologist
 Kristy Oatley (born 1978), Australian equestrian
 Lyndal Oatley (born 1980), Australian equestrian
 Michael Oatley (born 1935), MI6 officer
 Neil Oatley (born 1954), automotive engineer
 Thomas Oatley, Archdeacon of Lewes, 1486

Places 
 Oatley, New South Wales,  a southern suburb of Sydney, Australia
 Oatley Bay, a bay in the Georges River Council, NSW
 Oatley Park, New South Wales, a reserve beside the Georges River in Oatley, NSW
 Oatley Pleasure Grounds, a bush park in Oatley, NSW
 Oatley railway station, on the Illawarra line in Oatley, NSW